Mehrdad Bashagardi (born 3 September 1984) is an Iranian footballer who currently playing for Havadar.

Club career
Bashagardi was with Sanat Naft from 2009 to 2014.

On November 20, 2015, Bashagardi made his debut for Foolad in a home defeat against Esteghlal.

References

Living people
Sanat Naft Abadan F.C. players
Iranian footballers
1984 births
Association football goalkeepers